Brahmagiri may refer to:

 Brahmagiri (Maharashtra), a hill in the Western Ghats range in Maharashtra, India; source of the River Godavari
 Brahmagiri (Karnataka), a mountain range in the Western Ghats range in Karnataka, India
 Brahmagiri archaeological site, in Karnataka
 Brahmagiri Wildlife Sanctuary, in Karnataka
 Brahmagiri, Odisha, India, a town
 Brahmagiri Assembly constituency, a constituency of the Odisha Legislative Assembly